The 1993–94 La Liga season, the 63rd since its establishment, started on September 4, 1993, and finished on May 15, 1994. The league was won by Barcelona for the fourth consecutive season, their fourteenth league title.

Team information

Clubs and locations

League table

Results

Relegation playoff

Tiebreak

First Leg

Second Leg

Tiebreak

Pichichi Trophy

1993 1994
1993–94 in Spanish football leagues
Spain